Cochlostoma achaicum is a species of small land snail with an operculum, a terrestrial gastropod mollusc in the family Cochlostomatidae.

Geographic distribution 
C. achaicum is endemic to Greece, where it occurs widely on the Peloponnese peninsula.

References

Diplommatinidae
Molluscs of Europe
Endemic fauna of Greece
Gastropods described in 1885